Callionymus colini, the Tiny New Guinea longtail dragonet, is a species of dragonet endemic to the Pacific Ocean waters around Papua New Guinea.

Etymology
The specific name honours Dr Patrick L. Colin, of the University of Papua New Guinea's Motupore Island Research Station in Port Moresby, who collected the type specimen.

References 

C
Fish described in 1993
Taxa named by Ronald Fricke